Kristina Georgieva (Bulgarian: Кристина Георгиева) (born 24 June 1992) is a Bulgarian beauty pageant titleholder who was crowned Miss Universe Bulgaria 2014 and represented Bulgaria at the Miss Universe 2014 pageant.

She is currently studying business administration in Netherlands.

Miss Universe Bulgaria 2014
Kristina competed with twenty other beauties for the coveted crown. On 18 September 2014 Georgieva was crowned Miss Universe Bulgaria 2014 at Sofia. She represented Bulgaria at Miss Universe 2014 pageant in Doral, USA on 25 January 2015 but unplaced. Radinela Chusheva, Evelyn Nikolova and Pamela Kristeva finished as the runners-up at the finals.

References

External links

Living people
Bulgarian expatriates in the Netherlands
Bulgarian female models
Bulgarian beauty pageant winners
Miss Universe 2014 contestants
1992 births